Scouting and Guiding in Lithuania consist of a number of different organizations, some of them connected to international bodies. Besides open associations, there are also some for the national minorities living in Lithuania, as well as Girl Scouts of the USA.

Lithuanian organizations
Lithuanian Scout organizations include (membership numbers from )
 Lietuvos skautija (LS), member of the World Organization of the Scout Movement, registered in 1996, 1,446 members
 Lietuvos skaučių seserija, associate member of the World Association of Girl Guides and Girl Scouts, restarted in 1989, 652 members
 Lietuvos jaunųjų krikščionių sąjungos skautai ir skautės (LJKSSS), YMCA and YWCA Scouts and Guides, registered in 1996, 130 members
 Jūrų skautija "Divytis", Lithuanian Sea Scouts, registered in 2001, 600 members
 Lietuvos lenkų harcerių (skautų) sąjunga (LLHS), connected to Związek Harcerstwa Polskiego, aimed at ethnic Poles, restarted in 1989, 400 members
 Lietuvos Nacionalinė Europos Skautų Asociacija (LNESA), belonging to the UIGSE, founded in 1992, 300 members
 Lietuvos skautų sąjunga (LSS), restarted in 1989, 1,000 members
 Visagino skautų organizacija (VSO), connected to LS and to ORYuR, aimed at ethnic Russians, founded in 1992, 300 members (50 active)
 Žemaitijos skautų organizacija (ŽSO), belonging to the World Federation of Independent Scouts (WFIS), founded in 2002, 150 members
 "Związek Harcerstwa Polskiego na Litwie" (ZHPnL) (Polish Scouting Association in Lithuania) belonging to the Confédération Européenne de Scoutisme

Alumni organizations
Alumni organizations include
 Lietuvos suaugusių skautų bendrija (LSSB) for former Scouts and Guides, member of ISGF, founded in 1992, 50 members
 Studentų skautų korporacija "Vytis", Akademinė skaučių draugovė ir Skautų filisterių sąjunga (Korp!Vytis, ASD ir SFS), an academic corporation of Scouts and Guides, restarted in 1989, 200 members

Lithuanian Scouts-in-exile
The association Lietuvių Skautų Sąjunga was formed after World War II and serves the Lithuanian communities abroad. As of 2008, there were active units in Australia, Canada, the United Kingdom and the United States. Most of these units were also members of the respective National Scout Organization within WOSM.

International Scout units in Lithuania
In addition, there are USA Girl Scouts Overseas in Vilnius, serviced by way of USAGSO headquarters in New York.

See also

Lithuanian Riflemen's Union

References

External links
 Lietuvos skautija
 Lietuvos jaunųjų krikščionių sąjungos skautai ir skautės
 Lietuvos jūrų skautija
 Lietuvos Nacionalinė Europos Skautų Asociacija
 Studentų skautų korporacija "Vytis"
 Visagino skautų organizacija
 Lietuvių Skautų Sąjunga - Lithuanian Scouts-in-exile

 
Youth organizations based in Lithuania